Rhinoseius is a genus of mites in the family Ascidae.

Species
 Rhinoseius androdon Fain & Hyland, 1980      
 Rhinoseius antioquiensis Fain & Hyland, 1980      
 Rhinoseius bakeri (Dusbabek & Cerny, 1970)      
 Rhinoseius bisacculatus Fain, Hyland & Aitken, 1977      
 Rhinoseius braziliensis Baker & Yunker, 1964      
 Rhinoseius caucaensis Ohmer, Fain & Schuchmann, 1991      
 Rhinoseius changensis (Baker & Yunker, 1964)      
 Rhinoseius chiriquensis (Baker & Yunker, 1964)      
 Rhinoseius chocoensis Wiese & Fain, 1996      
 Rhinoseius eisenmanni (Baker & Yunker, 1964)      
 Rhinoseius epoecus Colwell & Naeem, 1979      
 Rhinoseius erro (Baker & Yunker, 1964)      
 Rhinoseius eutoxeres Fain & Hyland, 1980      
 Rhinoseius fairchildi (Baker & Yunker, 1964)      
 Rhinoseius haplophaedia Ohmer, Fain & Schuchmann, 1991      
 Rhinoseius heliconiae (Baker & Yunker, 1964)      
 Rhinoseius  Naskrecki & Colwell, 1998      
 Rhinoseius mathewsoni Hyland, Fain & Moorhouse, 1978      
 Rhinoseius nadachowskyi Wiese & Fain, 1993      
 Rhinoseius  Wiese & Fain, 1993      
 Rhinoseius peregrinator (Baker & Yunker, 1964)      
 Rhinoseius phaethornis Fain, Hyland & Aitken, 1977      
 Rhinoseius phoreticus Fain, Hyland & Aitken, 1977      
 Rhinoseius rafinskii Micherdzinski & Lukoschus, 1980      
 Rhinoseius richardsoni Hunter, 1972      
 Rhinoseius tiponi Baker & Yunker, 1964      
 Rhinoseius trinitatis Fain, Hyland & Aitken, 1977      
 Rhinoseius ucumariensis Wiese & Fain, 1993      
 Rhinoseius uniformis Fain, Hyland & Aitken, 1977      
 Rhinoseius venezuelensis (Baker & Yunker, 1964)      
 Rhinoseius  Fain & Hyland, 1980      
 Rhinoseius wetmorei (Baker & Yunker, 1964)

References

Ascidae